is a Japanese writer of hardboiled fiction and thrillers. He served as the 12th President of the Mystery Writers of Japan from 2005 to 2009.

Works in English translation
Detective Samejima series (Shinjuku Shark series)
 Shinjuku Shark (original title: Shinjuku-Zame), trans. Andrew Clare (Vertical, 2007)
 The Poison Ape (original title: Doku-Zaru: Shinjuku-Zame 2), trans. Deborah Iwabuchi (Vertical, 2008)

"Same" or "zame" means "shark" in English.

Essay
 My Favourite Mystery, "The Darkest Hour" by William P. McGivern (Mystery Writers of Japan, Inc. )

Awards
 1978 – Shosetsu Suiri New Writers Prize: Kanshō no Machikado (Sentimental Streets) (short story)
 1991 – Mystery Writers of Japan Award for Best Novel: Shinjuku Shark
 1991 – Yoshikawa Eiji Prize for New Writers: Shinjuku Shark
 1991 – The Best Japanese Crime Fiction of the Year (Kono Mystery ga Sugoi! 1991): Shinjuku Shark
 1993 – Naoki Prize: Mugen Ningyō: Shinjuku-Zame 4 (Poisoning Doll: Shinjuku Shark 4)
 2000 – Japan Adventure Fiction Association Prize: Kokoro de wa Omosugiru (The Heart Is Too Heavy)
 2001 – Japan Adventure Fiction Association Prize: Yamisaki Annainin (Guide into Darkness)
 2004 – Shibata Renzaburo Prize: Pandora Airando (Pandora Island )
 2006 – Japan Adventure Fiction Association Prize: Ōkami-Bana: Shinjuku-Zame 9 (The Werewolf: Shinjuku Shark 9)
 2010 – Japan Mystery Literature Award for Lifetime Achievement
 2011 – Japan Adventure Fiction Association Prize: Kizuna Kairō: Shinjuku-Zame 10 (Ties That Bind: Shinjuku Shark 10)

Main works

Private detective Ko Sakuma series
Novels
 , 1980
 , 1986
 , 1996
 , 2000
Short story collections
 , 1982
 , 1985

Arbeit detective series
 , 1986 (short story collection)
 , 1987 (novel)
 , 1988 (novel)
 , 1989 (novel)
 , 1991 (novel)
 , 2004 (novel)

Detective Samejima series (Shinjuku Shark series)
Novels
 , 1990 (Shinjuku Shark, Vertical, 2007)
 , 1991 (The Poison Ape, Vertical, 2008)
 , 1993
 , 1993
 , 1995
 , 1997
 , 2001
 , 2000
 , 2006
 , 2011
Short story collection
 , 2012

Standalone novels
 , 2001
 , 2004

See also

Japanese detective fiction
Tozai Mystery Best 100

References

External links
 Profile at J'Lit Books from Japan 

1956 births
20th-century Japanese novelists
21st-century Japanese novelists
Japanese male short story writers
Japanese crime fiction writers
Mystery Writers of Japan Award winners
Living people
People from Nagoya
20th-century Japanese short story writers
21st-century Japanese short story writers
20th-century Japanese male writers
21st-century male writers